Nason Rural Municipality (Nason Gaupalika) (Nepali: नासोँ गाउँपालिका) is a Gaunpalika in Manang District in Gandaki Province of Nepal. On 12 March 2017, the government of Nepal implemented a new local administrative structure, in which VDCs have been replaced with municipal and Village Councils. Nason is one of these 753 local units.

References 

Manang District, Nepal
Populated places in Manang District, Nepal
Rural municipalities of Nepal established in 2017
Rural municipalities in Manang District